The Plant Proteome Database is a National Science Foundation-funded project to determine the biological function of each protein in plants. It includes data for two plants that are widely studied in molecular biology,  Arabidopsis thaliana and maize (Zea mays).   Initially the project was limited to plant plastids, under the name of the Plastid PDB, but was expanded  and renamed Plant PDB in November 2007.

See also
 Proteome

References

External links
Plant Proteome Database home page

Plant physiology
Government databases in the United States
Biological databases